Pavličine is a village in the municipality of Crna Trava, Serbia. According to the 2002 census, the village has a population of 40 people.

References

Populated places in Jablanica District